The Saint-Léonard Cavern or la caverne de Saint-Léonard is a cave on the island of Montreal, in Quebec, Canada. It is located underneath Pie-XII Park (Pius XII Park) in the borough of Saint-Léonard in Montreal. It is a registered historic site. The cavern has restricted access but guided tours are available.

History
The cave was discovered in 1812. During the Patriote Rebellion of 1837, it served as an armoury, weapons cache, and hidey-hole for Les Patriotes. In 1968, the government deemed it a safety risk and closed off the cave. In 1978, the Quebec Speleological Society reopened the cave for study. It was subsequently declared a historic landmark, and tours were set up. Until 2017, the cave was thought to be comparatively small underground structure, at 35 metres long with a depth of 8 metres. However, a second cave was discovered in 2017 which measures 250 metres long. This dimension may be extended with further exploration.

References

External links

 Show Caves of Canada, Cavernicole de Saint-Léonard
 The Secret Montreal Cave You Can Visit And Explore, Mtl Blog
  Quebec Speleological Society, La caverne de Saint-Léonard

Caves of Quebec
Show caves
Saint-Leonard, Quebec